Rossmoor is a gated community in Walnut Creek, California, with a population of about 9,200.  It was one of the first "active adult" communities for residents 55 years or older in the San Francisco Bay Area.

History 
In the 1930s, the shipping tycoon Stanley Dollar constructed an estate in Tice Creek Valley near Walnut Creek in Contra Costa County. The Dollars bred purebred Hereford cattle and raised show horses.

In 1960, R. Stanley Dollar, Jr. (the son of the shipping magnate) sold the family estate to Ross W. Cortese. Cortese owned a development company called Rossmoor Corporation. He had been active in Orange County and the unincorporated community there named Rossmoor was one of his projects. After finishing Rossmoor he started on a new idea of private gated retirement communities for active seniors called Leisure World, starting with the Seal Beach Leisure World in Seal Beach in 1960.

Leisure World promised low-cost housing, coupled with services appropriate to Cortese's view of retirement; golf courses, swimming pools, clubhouses, riding stables, transportation, medical services and a host of administrative employees so that the residents did not have to bother themselves with house and yard maintenance, even little things like waste collection, cable television service and watering the lawn.

Cortese's plans were too ambitious and he lost control of Rossmoor in Walnut Creek almost immediately after ground was first broken. The name "Leisure World" is still used as a trademark by Cortese's family, but it has not been applied to Rossmoor in Walnut Creek for many years. Cortese's idea was popular, and others carried out his scheme.

Community description

Rossmoor Walnut Creek is a senior adult community located in the  Tice Valley area of Walnut Creek, California. Development of the community began in 1963 and, today, there are approximately 6,700 residential units in three cooperatives, 12 condominium and one single-family home developments (referred to as Homeowner Associations or HOAs). Forty percent of the homes are garden-style duplexes to four-plexes, and the remaining are either mid-to-high-rise, and one area of 63 individual single-family homes. Homes vary in price from mid $200,000s for some cooperatives to over $1 million for the single-family homes and garden style condominiums. At least one resident must be 55 years of age or older to live in a home in Rossmoor.

Amenities include two NCGA-rated golf courses (one nine-hole and one 18-hole), a large indoor pool and fitness complex, two outdoor pools, six tennis courts, lawn bowling greens, bocce courts, hiking trails and table tennis facilities.

Management
Rossmoor is managed by the Golden Rain Foundation, which is a nonprofit corporation. It has nine directors, each elected from separate districts in Rossmoor. Each director serves a three-year term, with no director serving for more than two terms.

References

External links
 Rossmoor official site
 The Rossmoor weekly newspaper site

Neighborhoods in Walnut Creek, California
Gated communities in California